Caspian International Petroleum Company (CIPCO) (Azerbaijani: Xəzər Beynəlxalq Neft Şirkəti) was a joint operating company established by production shareholding companies for exploration, development and production sharing of the Karabakh field in the section of the Caspian Sea within Azerbaijan.

History
It was incorporated on 4 June 1996. The company was led by President James A. Tilley, who had been the President of Pennzoil Caspian.

Shareholders of CIPCO had the following stakes in Karabakh field:

Feasibility studies
The company estimated an investment of up to $2 billion, if the feasibility studies proved the expectations for reserves. CIPCO spent nearly $100 million on feasibility studies. 

Closure
In January 1999, the consortium management announced the project was not commercially feasible and as of 23 February 1999 it stopped its operations and was dissolved.

See also

Azeri-Chirag-Guneshli — Caspian Sea oil fields.
Karabakh (Oil and Gas field) — Caspian Sea oil field.
Sangachal Terminal — natural gas processing and oil production plant on the coast of the Caspian Sea.

References

External links
SOCAR: information on Karabakh field project

Defunct oil and gas companies of Azerbaijan
Caspian Sea
Defunct oil companies
Joint ventures
Energy companies established in 1996
Non-renewable resource companies established in 1996
Non-renewable resource companies disestablished in 1999
1996 establishments in Azerbaijan
1999 disestablishments in Azerbaijan
Defunct energy companies of Azerbaijan